The Polaris RZR (pronounced "razor") is a sport side-by-side produced by Polaris Industries. When launched in 2007 as a 2008 model, it was officially known as the Ranger RZR, as it was marketed as a sub-model of the larger, work-oriented Ranger. As the RZR gained popularity, Polaris eventually dropped the Ranger designation and positioned the RZR as a stand-alone model.

RZR models in the US

Civilian models:
 RZR 170
 RZR 570
 RZR 800
 RZR S 800
 RZR 900
 RZR S 900
 RZR XP 900
 RZR S 1000
 RZR XP 1000
 RZR XP Turbo
 RZR XP Turbo S
 RZR RS1
 RZR Turbo R
 RZR Pro R
Military models:
 MRZR-2
 MRZR-4
 MRZR-D2
 MRZR-D4

Military use

U.S. Special Operations Command, (USSOCOM), placed an order with Polaris Defense in September 2013 for up to 1,500 MRZR-2 (2-seat) and MRZR-4 (4-seat) machines. A big drawback of these new small military vehicles was that they retained their original gasoline engines, which are incompatible with standard military JP-8 fuel. In terms of logistics, two different fuel types are undesirable. As few such machines see combat use, and civilian users are uninterested in running them on diesel, an engine change was deemed unlikely.

In November 2016, the U.S. Marine Corps signed a $2.5 million contract with Polaris to deliver 144 MRZR-D vehicles. Called the Utility Task Vehicle (UTV), it is designed to be diesel-powered and can run on JP-8 fuel. The Marines bought the unarmored vehicles because they can fit inside an MV-22 Osprey, enabling them to be deployed from long distances, to provide logistics support to ground combat units, assisting them to travel and transport supplies quicker and easier than previously on foot. The vehicles can carry four marines and have a small cargo bed capable of carrying  of payload. Plans are to field 18 MRZR-Ds per infantry regiment. The vehicles were delivered from late-January to April 2017.

U.S. Army soldiers with Special Operations Task Force / South also used Polaris RZR 800 Light Tactical All-Terrain Vehicles (LT-ATV), internally transportable by CH-47 Chinook helicopter, and rapidly off-loadable, during operations in 2010 in the Maruf District, Kandahar Province, Afghanistan.

The Royal Navy has procured a batch of Polaris MRZR-D4 UTVs for the Royal Marines and a version of the MRZR has been in service with UK Special Forces for a number of years

Current operators

 Argentine Army

 Indian Army

 New Zealand Army

 National Republican Guard (Emergency Protection and Relief Unit)
 Portuguese Army (Special Operations Troops Centre)

Royal Thai Army

Armed Forces of Turkmenistan

Royal Marines
United Kingdom Special Forces

 United States Special Operations Command
United States Marine Corps

Fire hazards and recalls

For 2010, Polaris developed their own engine for the RZR, known as the ProStar.  Unlike the previous engine, which had the exhaust cooled by airflow, the ProStar equipped RZR connected the engine to the exhaust header pipe in the front of the engine, before making a 180 degree turn and exiting at the rear of the vehicle.  This design creates a hot spot directly behind passengers that can degrade components and ignite debris, fuel and plastic panels.  Customers soon reported plastic panels between the passengers and the engine were melting and smoking and Polaris' safety director at the time believed the vehicle should be recalled.  However, no recall was performed, with Polaris issuing a service bulletin which does not require Polaris to issue notice to consumers or the Consumer Product Safety Commission.

In July 2014, an 11-year-old girl from Texas suffered 3rd and 4th degree burns on 60% of her body when the Polaris she was riding in tipped over and ignited. Her right leg and left foot were later amputated. A 15-year-old girl was killed when the RZR she was a passenger in caught fire in July 2015. In September 2016, two Arizona women were killed when their Polaris tipped over and sparked a fire.

In April 2018, Polaris was fined a record $27.5 million by the Consumer Product Safety Commission (CPSC) for two 2016 late-reporting claims relating to a fire risk. The CPSC alleges Polaris had received reports of 150 RZR fires, including the death of the above-mentioned 15 year old passenger, 11 reports of burn injuries and a fire that burned 10 acres of land, but failed to immediately notify them. Over the years, Polaris has recalled more than half a million RZR's for manufacturing defects that could lead to fires, burns or death. However, owners of RZRs are continuing to report fires on vehicles that been previously repaired, including total-loss fires.

In May 2019, a 23-year-old man from Idaho suffered fatal burns when the RZR he was riding in burst into flames., despite the 2017 RZR receiving the repairs under the 2018 recall.

Specifications

Numbers above are for the first model year available. Units in inches unless otherwise noted. Numbers are manufacturer's where available.

References

External links
 2018 Polaris RZR Models | Polaris RZR

Off-road vehicles
Vehicles introduced in 2007
Military vehicles introduced in the 2000s
Military vehicles of the United States
ATVs